Task Force 6–26 is a United States Joint military/Government Agency, originally set-up to find "High Value Targets" (HVT's) in Iraq in the aftermath of Operation Iraqi Freedom. This Special Operations unit is very similar to Task Force 121 which was created to capture Saddam Hussein and high-ranking Al-Qaeda members. The various name changes seen by the group are to ensure Operational Security, although their makeup and goals largely remain the same. The main objective of Task Force 6–26 was the capture or liquidation of terror leader Abu Musab al-Zarqawi, who led Al-Qaeda in Iraq. The unit is made up of U.S. Special Operations Forces members including Delta Force, DEVGRU, 24th Special Tactics Squadron and the 75th Ranger Regiment along with the CIA's Special Activities Center. Other military and DIA personnel are believed to have been involved as 'limited' members of the unit, along with FBI agents.

Members of 6–26 had fanned out in areas ranging from Baghdad, Mosul and to Fallujah and other areas in the contested Al Anbar province in search of al-Zarqawi, and have been very successful in eliminating many leaders of his group, and killing al-Zarqawi on 8 June 2006.

The unit operated an interrogation cell at Camp Nama, one of Saddam Hussein's former military bases near Baghdad. There, American soldiers made one of the former Iraqi government's interrogation facilities into one of their own, calling it "The Black Room." In 2004 it was reported that the force was running a secret prison in Baghdad and abusing prisoners; the unit was implicated in two prisoner deaths. The unit has been under investigation since at least 2003, but prosecution has been elusive, as members of the unit used false identities and claimed to have lost 70 percent of their records due to a computer malfunction. The other primary name for the Task Force has been OCF, or Other Coalition Forces. In both cases the unit has command infrastructure in both theaters of war at an MSS (Mission Staging Site) in Baghdad Iraq and at OCF compound at Bagram Air Base, Afghanistan.

See also 
 Task Force 121
 Task Force 145

References

Special forces task forces of the United States
Joint task forces of the United States Armed Forces
Occupation of Iraq